Rock City is a village in Stephenson County, Illinois. The population was 315 at the 2010 census, up from 313 in 2000.

Geography
Rock City is located at  (42.412685, -89.468058).

Demographics

2010 U.S. Census

At the 2010 census, there were 315 people which is an increase of 0.6% from the 2000 census. This breaks down as 174 males and 141 females. A total of 307 people were Non-Hispanic or Latino. By race, there were 305 people indicated as white with the remaining 10 indicated as being identified by two or more races.

There were a total of 128 housing units with 123 occupied. Of the 128 households, 47.8% had children under the age of 18 living with them. The average household size was 2.56 and the average family size was 3.06.

The median household income was $56,731, and the median family income was $71,250. Males had a median income of $40,446 versus $26,250 for females.

The three largest employers in Rock City are Pregl Services, US Bank, and Tri-District Ambulance.

2000 U.S. Census

At the 2000 census, there were 313 people, 120 households, and 81 families residing in the village. The racial makeup of the village was 99.68% White, and 0.32% from two or more races.

There were 120 households, of which 40.0% had children under the age of 18 living with them, 55.8% were married couples living together, 7.5% had a female householder with no husband present, and 31.7% were non-families. 28.3% of all households were made up of individuals, and 18.3% had someone living alone who was 65 years of age or older. The average household size was 2.61 and the average family size was 3.24.

Age distribution was 31.0% under the age of 18, 6.4% from 18 to 24, 28.8% from 25 to 44, 16.6% from 45 to 64, and 17.3% who were 65 years of age or older. The median age was 34 years. For every 100 females, there were 93.2 males. For every 100 females age 18 and over, there were 92.9 males.

The median household income was $46,250, and the median family income was $51,750. Males had a median income of $35,417 versus $25,417 for females. The per capita income for the village was $20,920. About 3.4% of families and 4.7% of the population were below the poverty line, including 2.9% of those under age 18 and 5.1% of those age 65 or over.

References

External links
Stephenson County

Villages in Stephenson County, Illinois
Villages in Illinois
Populated places established in 1859
1859 establishments in Illinois